The Roman Catholic Diocese of Shrewsbury is a Roman Catholic diocese in the Province of Birmingham which encompasses the pre-1974 counties of Shropshire and Cheshire in the North West and West Midlands of England.

The diocese includes rural areas of Shropshire as well as Manchester south of the River Mersey and other urban areas such as  Birkenhead, Stockport and Ellesmere Port. The current bishop, Mark Davies, succeeded on 1 October 2010.

Geographical location 
The diocese comprises the counties of Shropshire and Cheshire and the parts of Greater Manchester and Merseyside which were formerly in Cheshire.  Before 1895, it also included North Wales.  In 2007, new pastoral areas and regions were created, replacing the former deaneries.

Past and present bishops

Ordinaries

 
 James Brown (appointed 27 June 1851 – died 14 October 1881)
 Edmund James Knight (appointed 25 April 1882 – resigned 28 May 1895)
 John Carroll (succeeded 11 May 1895 – died 14 January 1897)
 Samuel Webster Allen (appointed 19 April 1897 – died 13 May 1908)
 Hugh Singleton (appointed 1 August 1908 – died 17 December 1934)
 Ambrose James Moriarty (succeeded 17 December 1934 – died 3 June 1949)
 John Aloysius Murphy (succeeded 3 June 1949 – translated to the Archdiocese of Cardiff on 22 August 1961)
 William Eric Grasar (appointed 26 April 1962 – resigned 20 March 1980)
 Joseph Gray (appointed 19 August 1980 – retired 23 June 1995)
 Brian Michael Noble (appointed 23 June 1995 – retired 1 October 2010)
 Mark Davies (current bishop, succeeded 1 October 2010)

Coadjutor Bishops
John Carroll (1893-1895)
Mark Davies (2009-2010)
Ambrose James Moriarty (1931-1934)
John Aloysius Murphy (1948-1949)

Auxiliary Bishops
John (Jack) Brewer (1971-1983), appointed Coadjutor Bishop of Lancaster
Edmund James Knight (1879-1882), appointed Bishop here

Other priests of this diocese who became bishops
Philip Anthony Egan, appointed Bishop of Portsmouth in  2012
Francis Edward Joseph Mostyn, appointed Vicar Apostolic of Wales, Wales in 1895
Gerard William Tickle, appointed Bishop of Great Britain, Military in 1963

Catholic education in the diocese

There are 112 Catholic schools and colleges serving 43,198 pupils.

 All figures are as of August 2019

Patron saints of the diocese 

1) Our Lady, Help of Christians – 24 May2) Saint Winefride – 3 November

Parish pastoral areas and regions 

On 1 October 2007, local deaneries were abolished and parishes grouped together to form 'Pastoral Areas', not as a replacement of parishes but to strengthen local Catholic communities, ensuring the sharing of services and groups and to avoid unnecessary duplication.   Each LPT (local pastoral team [see below]) has two co-leaders (one priest; one layperson) and each region is headed by a Regional Dean.

Region A – Shropshire & Wrekin Catholic Region 

Regional Dean: Canon Stephen Coonan

Region B – Central Cheshire
Regional Dean: Fr John Daly

Region C – North Cheshire
Regional Dean: Fr Russell Cooke

Region D – South Trafford & Wythenshawe
Regional Dean: Fr John Rafferty

Region E – Stockport & Tameside
Regional Dean:

Region F – Wirral
Regional Dean: Fr Nick Kern

Modern history 
thumb|right|200px|Shrewsbury Cathedral was  opened in 1856

The first bishop of the diocese was James Brown, president of Sedgeley Park School, who was consecrated 27 July 1851. Out of a total population of 1,082,617, Catholics numbered about 20,000. There were thirty churches and chapels attended by resident priests, and six stations; one convent, that of the Faithful Companions of Jesus, in Birkenhead, to which was attached a boarding school for young ladies, and also a small day-school for poor children. There were Jesuits at Holywell, who also had a college at St. Bruno's, Flintshire, and a Benedictine at Acton Burnell. When Dr. Brown celebrated the jubilee of his consecration, the secular priests had increased to sixty-six and the regulars to thirty-two. Instead of one religious house of men and one of women, there were now four of men and nine of women; and many elementary schools had been provided for the needs of Catholic children.

In 1852 the bitter feeling caused by the re-establishment of the hierarchy found vent in serious riots at Stockport. On 29 June a large mob attacked the Church of St Philip and St James; they broke the windows and attempted to force in the doors, but before they could effect an entrance, Canon Randolph Frith, the rector, succeeded in removing the Blessed Sacrament, and secreting it with the chalices, etc., in a small cupboard in the side chapel. He was compelled to flee immediately to the belltower, and, whilst the rabble were destroying whatever they could lay their hands upon, he made his escape along the roof, and descended by the spouting at the back of the presbytery. Much of the church furniture, with vestments, etc., was piled up in the street and burned. At St Michael's, the Host was desecrated, and the pyx and ciborium carried away.

Although the Catholic population of the diocese was 58,013 (as of the early 20th century), Shropshire contributed under 3,000, partly on account of agricultural depression and the consequent flocking to industrial centres. There were ninety clergy, sixteen convents, representatives of four orders of men, eight secondary schools for girls, an orphanage and industrial school for boys, a home for aged poor, a home for penitents, and an orphanage erected in memory of Bishop Knight. At Oakwood Hall, Romiley, a house of retreats for working-men opened and had done important work; and at New Brighton, the nuns of Our Lady of the Cenacle opened a house of retreats for working-women and ladies.

Shropshire is singularly rich in archaeological interest, its pre-Reformation parish churches, the noble ruins of monasteries round the Wrekin, the Roman city of Viroconium (Wroxeter), the lordly castle of Ludlow, giving the county a place apart in the heart of the antiquary. In Shrewsbury itself, where once Grey, Black, and Austin Friars and the Black Monks of St. Benedict had foundations, there is now the cathedral, designed by Edward Pugin. Chester, too, with its streets, black and white houses, and venerable cathedral and city walls, claims the visitor's attention. When the body of Daniel O'Connell was brought back from Genoa, it rested in the old chapel in Queen's Street on its way to Ireland.

See also
Diocese of Shrewsbury Lourdes Hospitalité
Diocese of Shrewsbury Lourdes Pilgrimage

References

Bibliography

External links
Website of the Diocese
Catholic Hierarchy – Diocese Information
Diocese Vocation Office
GCatholic.org
Website of LPA 17 (Holy Family LPA)
The Web of Our Lady and St Christopher's Romiley

 
Religious organisations based in England
Religion in Shropshire
Religion in Cheshire
Shrewsbury
Shrewsbury